Syloti Nagri is a Unicode block containing characters of the Syloti Nagri script for writing the Sylheti language.

History
The following Unicode-related documents record the purpose and process of defining specific characters in the Syloti Nagri block:

References 

Unicode blocks
Sylheti language